Greywell Fen is a  biological Site of Special Scientific Interest in Greywell in Hampshire.

There is a large area of wet grassland, which is grazed by cattle, and a small area of carr woodland. Meadow flora include cowslip, dyer's greenweed and pepper-saxifrage.

References

 

Hampshire and Isle of Wight Wildlife Trust
Sites of Special Scientific Interest in Hampshire